Thuththiri is a long running Sri Lankan science fiction television series broadcast on Sirasa TV and directed by Sanjaya Nirmal. The drama is about extraterrestrials invading Earth.

Plot 

The story is based on a mythical belief that people will live under thuththiri plants in future. The drama begins with the invasion of a group of aliens to the earth, starring Michelle Dilhara, Morin Charuni, Kavinga Perera and Jake Senaratna. It is said that they were sent to protect the earth from pollution and over consumption of poisonous materials. With their extraordinary skills they quickly learned the human behaviorism and human language in order to communicate with people. The aliens live inside a housing scheme where people tend to interact more with each other.

Cast and characters 
Paboda Sandeepani as Kia
Rithu Akarsha
Michelle Dilhara 
Anuradha Edirisinghe 
Medha Jayaratne 
Kavinga Perera 
Niroshan Wijesinghe 
Sanath Wimalasiri
Sandani Fernando as Tia
Maureen Charuni
Sangeeth Prabu Shankar

References

External links

Thuththiri on Sirasa TV

Sri Lankan television series
Alien invasions in fiction
2010s science fiction television series
Sirasa TV original programming